The British–Irish Council (BIC) is an intergovernmental organisation that aims to improve collaboration between its members in a number of areas including transport, the environment, and energy. Its membership comprises Ireland, the United Kingdom, the devolved governments of Northern Ireland, Scotland and Wales, and the governments of the Crown Dependencies of the UK: Guernsey, Jersey and the Isle of Man. England does not have a devolved administration, and as a result is not individually represented on the council but represented as a member of the UK.

The British and Irish governments, and political parties in Northern Ireland, agreed to form a Council under the British–Irish Agreement, part of the Good Friday Agreement reached in 1998. The council was formally established on 2 December 1999, when the Agreement came into effect. The council's stated aim is to "promote the harmonious and mutually beneficial development of the totality of relationships among the peoples of these islands". The BIC has a standing secretariat, located in Edinburgh, Scotland, and meets in semi-annual summit session and more frequent ministerial meetings.

Membership and operation 

Membership of the Council consists of the following administrations (with current heads of administrations as of  ):

The nine heads of government meet at summits twice per year. Additionally, there are regular meetings that deal with specific sectors which are attended by the corresponding ministers. Representatives of members operate in accordance with whatever procedures for democratic authority and accountability are in force in their respective elected legislatures.

England, unlike the other countries of the United Kingdom, is not represented separately, as it does not have its own devolved administration. It is thus solely represented on the council as part of the United Kingdom. Although Cornwall technically holds observer status on the Council due to its language, it is also represented by the UK government.

The work of the council is financed by members through mutual agreement as required. At the ninth meeting of the Council in July 2007 it was decided that with devolved government returned to Northern Ireland that an opportune time existed "to undertake a strategic review of the Council's work programmes, working methods and support arrangements." This decision included the potential for a permanent standing secretariat, which was established in Edinburgh, Scotland, on 4 January 2012.

At its June 2010 summit, the Council decided to move forward on recommendations to enhance the relationship between it and the British-Irish Parliamentary Assembly (BIPA). The British-Irish Parliamentary Assembly is made up of members from the parliaments and assemblies of the same states and regions as the members of the British–Irish Council. The Council tasked its secretariat with moving this work forward in conjunction with the BIPA's secretariat.

Work areas 

The Council agrees to specific work areas for which individual members take responsibility. The Belfast Agreement suggested transport links, agriculture, environmental issues, culture, health, education and approaches to the European Union as suitable topics for early discussion. However, these work areas can be expanded or reduced as the Council decides. It is also open to the council to make agreement on common policies. These agreements are made through consensus, although individual members may opt not to participate in implementing any of these.

The current list of work areas and the member responsible are:

 Collaborative spatial planning (Northern Ireland)
 Demography (Scotland)
 Digital inclusion (Isle of Man)
 Early years policy (Wales)
 Energy (United Kingdom – Electricity Grids, and Scotland – Marine)
 Environment (United Kingdom)

 Housing (Northern Ireland)
 Indigenous, minority and lesser-used languages (Wales)
 Misuse of Substances (drugs and alcohol) (Ireland)
 Social inclusion (Scotland and Wales)
 Transport (Northern Ireland)
 Creative Industries (Jersey)

Demography was adopted as a work area at the 2006 meeting of the council. It was proposed by the Scottish Executive, who also took responsibility for it. During the 2007 meeting of the council the Scottish Government further proposed that energy become a work area of the council. Past work sector areas included knowledge economy, e-health / telemedicine and tourism.

Name of the Council

Initial suggestions for the council included the names Council of the British Isles or Council of the Isles, and the council has sometimes been known by the latter name. However, owing to sensitivities around the term British Isles, particularly in Ireland, the name British–Irish Council was agreed.

The official name of the council is represented in minority and lesser-used languages of the council as:

 
 Guernésiais: 
 
 Jèrriais: 
 

 
 
 Ulster-Scots:

Summits

See also
 Council of Ireland
 North/South Ministerial Council
 British–Irish Intergovernmental Conference
 British–Irish Parliamentary Assembly

References

External links
 

1999 establishments in Ireland
1999 establishments in the United Kingdom
1999 in international relations
1999 in politics
Foreign relations of Guernsey
Foreign relations of Jersey
Foreign relations of the Isle of Man
Government of Northern Ireland
Government of Scotland
Government of Wales
International organizations based in Europe
Ireland and the Commonwealth of Nations
Ireland–United Kingdom relations
Northern Ireland peace process
Organisations based in Edinburgh
Politics of Europe
Politics of the British Isles
Politics of the Republic of Ireland
United Kingdom and the Commonwealth of Nations